Lieutenant General Knut Axel Ryding (28 August 1831 – 7 February 1897) was a Swedish Army officer. His senior commands include the post of Chief of the General Staff and commanding officer of the 3rd Military District and the 3rd Division. Ryding also served as Minister for War for five years.

Early life
Ryding was born on 28 August 1831 at Sandgärdet, near Vänersborg, in Västra Tunhem socken, Älvsborg County. He was the younger brother of Gustaf Ryding (1833–1901), future Governor of Västernorrland County. He passed studentexamen in Uppsala in 1849.

Career
Ryding was commissioned as an officer in the Göta Artillery Regiment in 1851 with the rank of underlöjtnant. Ryding was promoted to Captain there in 1863. In 1861–70 he served as a teacher of physics at the Higher Artillery School (Högre artilleriläroverket) in Marieberg and in 1863–72 he also served as a teacher of artillery and handguns at the Royal Military Academy. Furthermore, Ryding was a teacher of mathematics and physics at the Pharmaceutical Institute (Farmaceutiska institutet) from 1861 to 1875. After having served as secretary in the Committee on Defence in the Riksdag of 1871, Ryding was appointed General Staff officer the following year and was promoted to Major in the army that same year. Promoted to Lieutenant Colonel of the General Staff in 1873, he assumed the post of Chief of the Military Office of the Ministry of Land Defence in 1873. In 1875 he was promoted to Lieutenant Colonel and appointed commanding officer of the Jämtland Ranger Corps, from which he was transferred in 1879 as Colonel and regimental commander of Skaraborg Regiment. In February 1882, he was appointed Major General and Chief of the General Staff, but only held this position for a few months, when in June of that year he was appointed Council of State (Statsråd) and head of the Ministry of Land Defence, commonly known as Minister for War.

In this capacity, he presented to the Riksdag of 1883, that of the 1880 Land Defence Committee's (Lantförsvarskommittén), of which he was a member, large drafted proposal of a new army order; based on recruited regular troops and conscripts. However, despite the careful investigation of the defence issue and the persuasive manner in which Ryding fought for the implementation of the proposal, it was not adopted, mainly for the reason, that the Andra kammaren, by an overwhelming majority, decided to delete the provision contained in the proposal on the formation of reserve troops for the army, after which the Första kammaren rejected the proposal on the method of procurement of the regular troops. The fate, which thus affected the government's proposal, resulted in Ryding (along with the other members of the cabinet) asked for resignation from the cabinet, which, however, was not granted to him.

Over the next few years, Ryding tried with great energy on the "partial path of reforms" provide at least some increase in Sweden's defence force, but most of the proposals for that purpose, which were presented to the Riksdag, were stopped against the thrift of the Andra kammarens majority. However, when the Riksdag did not grant the necessary funds, Ryding resigned in 1887 from the cabinet. However, in 1885, he had been appointed commanding officer of the 3rd Military District (Tredje militärdistriktet), which position along with the associated command of the 3rd Division (Tredje fördelningen) he held until 1896, when, broken by a long-standing illness, he retired from military service. Prior to that, in 1892, he had been promoted to Lieutenant General. In 1883–87 Ryding was a member of the Första kammaren for Västernorrland County and in 1891–92 a member of the Andra kammaren for the cities of Mariestad, Skövde and Falköping. Ryding was a member of the Committee on Construction Basics for Gun Carriage to Field Cannons (Kommittén angående konstruktionsgrunder för lavett till fältkanoner) in 1872, in the Committee on the Defense of the Inlets to Stockholm and other Ports (Kommittén angående försvaret av inloppen till Stockholm och andra hamnar) from 1878 to 1879 and (for some time) in the Land Defence Committee (Lantförsvarskommittén) from 1880 to 1882; Chairman of the Committee on Field Management and Stage Regulations (Kommittén angående fältförvaltnings- och etappreglementen) from 1888 to 1892; member of the Army Order Committee (Härordningskommittén) from 1890 to 1891; Chairman of the Committee on Armament Plans for the Fortifications in the Stockholm Archipelago (Kommittén angående bestyckningsplaner för befästningarna i Stockholms skärgård), etc. from 1891 to 1892.

Personal life
Ryding married on 5 January 1875 in Vänersborg to Jenny Christina Rosalia (Rosalie) Petersson (5 February 1842 in Stockholm – 22 March 1925 in Stockholm), the daughter of Carl Gustaf Petersson and Johanna Maria Winberg. They had three children; Karin Astrid Kristina (born 3 April 1878), Jenny Marika Charlotta (20 August 1880 – 6 January 1955) and Johan Karl Axel (born 23 April 1882).

Death
Ryding died on 7 February 1897 in Skövde. He was buried at Sankta Elin Cemetery in Skövde.

Dates of rank
1851 – Underlöjtnant
1856 – Lieutenant
1863 – Captain
1872 – Major
1873 – Lieutenant Colonel
1879 – Colonel
1882 – Major General
1892 – Lieutenant General

Awards
Ryding's awards:

  Commander Grand Cross of the Order of the Sword
  Knight of the Order of St. Olav
  Grand Cross of the Saint Benedict of Aviz
  Grand Officer of the Legion of Honour
  Commander of the Order of Franz Joseph
  Knight of the Order of the Dannebrog

Honours
 Member of the Royal Swedish Academy of War Sciences (1866)

References

External links
 Entry at Svenskt biografiskt lexikon 

1831 births
1897 deaths
Swedish Army lieutenant generals
Swedish Ministers for Defence
People from Vänersborg Municipality
Members of the Första kammaren
Members of the Andra kammaren
Members of the Royal Swedish Academy of War Sciences
Commanders Grand Cross of the Order of the Sword
Commanders of the Order of Franz Joseph
Knights of the Order of the Dannebrog
Grand Officiers of the Légion d'honneur
Grand Crosses of the Order of Aviz